Gulf Harbors is an unincorporated community in western Pasco County, Florida, United States, near New Port Richey; however, the community has not been a census-designated place since 1970. According to Rand McNally, the latest population estimates for the community is approximately 5,000. Gulf Harbors and its sister communities, the Woodlands, Sea Forest, Sea Colony, Egrets Place and Harbor Colony are deed restricted, waterfront communities and cater to boating and fishing enthusiasts. It used to have a golf course that opened in 1973 and closed in 2011.

The community falls into the 34652 zip code and 727 area code.

External links
Community website

Unincorporated communities in Pasco County, Florida
Unincorporated communities in Florida
Populated coastal places in Florida on the Gulf of Mexico
Former census-designated places in Florida